The Zimbabwean cricket team toured Sri Lanka from 21 December 2001 to 15 January 2002. The tour consisted of three Tests.

Squads

Tour match

Three day:Tour Match:Sri Lanka Board XI v Zimbabweans

Test series

1st Test

2nd Test

3rd Test

Statistics

Most runs

Most wickets

External links
 Series home

2001 in Sri Lankan cricket
2001 in Zimbabwean cricket
International cricket competitions in 2001–02
Sri Lankan cricket seasons from 2000–01
2001-02